Kevin McCoy may refer to:
Kevin M. McCoy, Vice Admiral in the United States Navy and commander of Naval Sea Systems Command
Kevin McCoy (priest) (born 1954), American Roman Catholic priest and rector of the Pontifical North American College
Kevin McCoy (artist), New York City artist